Facchin is an Italian surname. Notable people with the surname include:

Andrea Facchin (born 1978), Italian canoeist
Davide Facchin (born 1987), Italian footballer
Marino Facchin (born 1913), Italian boxer

Italian-language surnames
Surnames of Italian origin